The Diocese of Uijeongbu, also romanized Uijongbu, is a particular church of the Latin Church of the Roman Catholic Church in South Korea. It is the newest diocese in South Korea, erected from the Archdiocese of Seoul on June 24, 2004 by the orders of Pope John Paul II, and a suffragan diocese of the same. Its mother church is the Cathedral of the Sacred Heart of Mary in Uijeongbu, Gyeonggi-do.

Bishops of Uijungbu
Joseph Lee Han-taek (2004–2010)
Peter Lee Ki-heon (2010–present)

References
GCatholic.org
Catholic Hierarchy

Gyeonggi Province
Roman Catholic dioceses in South Korea
Roman Catholic dioceses and prelatures established in the 21st century
Christian organizations established in 2004
Uijeongbu
Roman Catholic Ecclesiastical Province of Seoul